Simple People is a 1945 Soviet war film directed by Grigori Kozintsev and Leonid Trauberg. The film, along with the second part of Eisenstein's Ivan the Terrible was harshly criticized by Andrei Zhdanov and banned. A version of the film, released in 1956 during Khrushchev Thaw, was disowned by Kozintsev because the reediting was done without his participation.

Cast
 Yuri Tolubeyev - Yeryemin
 Olga Lebzak - Yeryemina
 Boris Zhukovsky - Makeev
 F. Babadzhanov - Akbashev
 Yekaterina Korchagina-Aleksandrovskaya - grandmother
 I. Kudryavtseva - Varvara
 Larisa Yemelyantseva - Sasha
 Vladimir Kolchin - Ivanov
 Tatyana Pelttser - Plaksina
 Anatoli Chiryev - Romka
 Aleksandr Larikov - Kizlyakov
 Konstantin Adashevky - the cook

External links

Lenfilm films
Soviet black-and-white films
Films directed by Grigori Kozintsev
Films directed by Leonid Trauberg
1945 films
Films scored by Dmitri Shostakovich
Soviet war films
1945 war films
1940s Russian-language films